Amadou Sanokho (born 1 September 1979) is a French former professional footballer who played as a midfielder or central defender.

Career 
Sanokho was formed in the FC Nantes Atlantique, one of the best French training centers.

He moved to Italian club FC Modena in 2001.

Afterward he will change has new of club, passing successively in West Ham United of premiership, Sangiustese of Italian Serie D, Burnley of Championship and Oldham Athletic of League One.

Sanokho then settled in Greece signing with Proodeftiki, before spending two seasons in the Atromitos in first Greek division. At Atromitos, he competed in the UEFA Cup playing against Sevilla.

In 2008, he transferred to APEP F.C. of the Cypriot First Division where stayed one year.

He returned to France joining UJA Alfortville of the Championnat National before returning to Greece in the Vyzas F.C. and later Iraklis Psachna.

References 
Footmercato 

Foot-National 

1979 births
Living people
French footballers
Footballers from Paris
Association football midfielders
Modena F.C. players
A.C. Sangiustese players
Burnley F.C. players
Oldham Athletic A.F.C. players
Atromitos F.C. players
Proodeftiki F.C. players
APEP FC players
Ethnikos Asteras F.C. players
Iraklis Psachna F.C. players
Cypriot First Division players
French expatriate footballers
French expatriate sportspeople in Italy
Expatriate footballers in Italy
French expatriate sportspeople in England
Expatriate footballers in England
French expatriate sportspeople in Cyprus
Expatriate footballers in Cyprus
French expatriate sportspeople in Greece
Expatriate footballers in Greece